A Tale of Two Rainie (literally: Double Rainie Play) is the ninth Mandarin studio album by Taiwanese Mandopop artist Rainie Yang. It was released on 12 December 2014 through EMI, her first album on the sublabel of Universal Music Taiwan. The lead single, "點水", written by Lala Hsu, was released on 6 November 2014. A special edition of the album was released on 9 January 2015.

Track listing

 Notes
 "我想愛" and "下個轉彎是你嗎'" were featured as the theme songs of the drama series Love at Second Sight.

Music videos

References

External links 
 A Tale of Two Rainie @ Universal Music Taiwan 

2014 albums
Rainie Yang albums
Universal Music Taiwan albums